Luka Sinđić (born 2 August 1988) is a Serbian football midfielder, playing for Italian club AS Melfi.

Career

References

External links
 
 Luka Sinđić stats at utakmica.rs 
 
 

1993 births
Living people
Footballers from Belgrade
Association football midfielders
Serbian footballers
Serbian expatriate footballers
FK Jedinstvo Ub players
FK Srem players
FK Kolubara players
FK Zemun players
FK Donji Srem players
FK Slavija Sarajevo players
FK Novi Pazar players
Maccabi Herzliya F.C. players
FK Vojvodina players
FK ČSK Čelarevo players
FK Sinđelić Beograd players
S.S.D. Audace Cerignola players
Serbian First League players
Serbian SuperLiga players
Premier League of Bosnia and Herzegovina players
Liga Leumit players
Serie D players
Serbian expatriate sportspeople in Bosnia and Herzegovina
Serbian expatriate sportspeople in Israel
Serbian expatriate sportspeople in Italy
Expatriate footballers in Bosnia and Herzegovina
Expatriate footballers in Israel
Expatriate footballers in Italy